Robert Simon Sherratt from the University of Reading, Reading, Berkshire, UK was named Fellow of the Institute of Electrical and Electronics Engineers (IEEE) in 2012 for contributions to embedded signal processing in consumer electronic devices and products.

References

Fellow Members of the IEEE
Living people
Year of birth missing (living people)
Place of birth missing (living people)